Anastas Kullurioti or Anastasios Koulouriotis (1822–1887) was an Arvanite Albanian writer and nationalist figure in Greece.

Biography
Born in Salamis, Ottoman Greece of Arvanite descent, he spent some of his early years there and later moved to Athens, where he settled in the Plaka district, being noted at the time as the "Albanian quarter" of the city. Still a young man, he emigrated to America and made his fortune, although little is known about that period of his life.

Upon his return to Greece, along with Panayotis Koupitoris, he founded the weekly Η φωνή της Αλβανίας, which lasted from September 1879 to mid-1880.  Among the goals of his nationalist activities were the founding of an Albanian political party in Greece, the opening of Albanian-language schools and the liberation of Albania from the Ottoman rule. In early 1880s, he traveled south Albania to win support for the nationalist cause, which inevitably brought him into conflict with both Turkish and Greek authorities. He got arrested in Gjirokastër with the request of the Greek consul and extradited to Corfu. He was imprisoned in Greece for some time, and he is said to have died poisoned in prison in Athens at the beginning of 1887.

Works
Αλβανικόν Αλφαβητάριον, ( Athens, 1882);
Reader Klumësht për foshnja ( Athens, 1882).

Notes and references

Notes

References

Bibliography
Faensen, Johannes: Die albanische Nationalbewegung. p.120.
Reso, Zihni: Anastas Kullurioti dhe gazeta "Zëri i Shqipërisë," 1879-1880.
Skëndi, Stavro: The Albanian national awakening, 1878-1912.
Elsie, Robert: Historical Dictionary of Albania. p. 252-253.
 

Arvanites
1822 births
1887 deaths
Greek writers
Greek emigrants to the United States
Albanian-language writers
Activists of the Albanian National Awakening
People from Salamis
19th-century Greek Americans
People from Salamis Island